Buzzin' Around is a 1933 American pre-Code comedy film starring Fatty Arbuckle, and directed by Alfred J. Goulding.

Plot
Cornelius (Roscoe 'Fatty' Arbuckle) invents a liquid which makes objects unbreakable and resilient.  Unfortunately he grabs the wrong jar when heading out to demonstrate his invention.  One mishap follows another in this slapstick comedy.

Cast
 Roscoe 'Fatty' Arbuckle as Cornelius
 Al St. John as Al
 Dan Coleman as Bit Part (uncredited)
 Fritz Hubert as Bit Part (uncredited)
 Donald MacBride as Policeman (uncredited)
 Gertrude Mudge as Cornelius's Ma (uncredited)
 Al Ochs as Bit Part (uncredited)
 Tom Smith as Bit Part (uncredited)
 Alice May Tuck as Bit Part (uncredited)
 Harry Ward as Bit Part (uncredited)

See also
 List of American films of 1933
 Fatty Arbuckle filmography

References

External links
 
 

1933 films
1933 comedy films
1933 short films
American black-and-white films
1930s English-language films
American comedy short films
Films directed by Alfred J. Goulding
Films produced by Samuel Sax
Vitaphone short films
Warner Bros. short films
1930s American films